The Seoul Jazz Festival is an annual jazz festival which takes place in the city of Seoul, South Korea. The festival spans across two or three days. Famous jazz artists from all around the world gather in Seoul every May to perform and enjoy jazz music with crowd. The year of 2016 was the festival's 10th anniversary.

History

Line-ups
2007
 DIMENSION & J-FUSION ALL STARS
 The Crusaders` JOE SAMPLE & RANDY CRAWFORD
 Pat Metheny Trio

2008
 The Crusaders 
 Chris Botti
 Incognito
 Nouvelle Vague
 Kwang Min Kim
 Hyung Woo Lee
 Jung Hyun Park 

2009
 Tower of Power 
 Madeleine Peyroux
 Wouter Hamel
 The Swell Season
 Omar Sosa

2010
 Jae Hyung Jung
 Wouter Hamel with Special Guest Sweet Sorrow
 Eric Benét
 D'Sound
 Matt Bianco
 Sergio Mendes

2011
 Pat Metheny
 Gary Burton
 Steve Swallow
 Antonio Sanchez

2012
 Earth, Wind & Fire
 George Benson
 Al Di Meola
 Eric Benét
 Brain Blade and The Fellowship Band
 Ledisi
 Sonoda Band
 The Bird
 Leessang

2013
 Ramsey Lewis Electric Band with Special Guest Philip Bailey 
 Damien Rice
 MIKA
 Parov Stelar Band
 Kings of Convenience
 Roy Hargove Quintet
 Wouter Hamel
 Hiromi the trio project
 Rodrigo Y Gabriela
 Tape Five
 Roberta Gambarini
 Maximilian Hecker
 Jeff Bernet
 La Ventana & 10cm
 David Choi & Clara C

2014
 Seung Hwan Lee
 Michel Camillo & Tomtito
 Chris Botti
 Damien Rice
 Jamie Cullum
 Jack Dejohnette Trio
 Gerald Albright
 Paolo Nutini
 Erlendøye
 Eddie Palmieri
 Joshua Redman Quartet
 Craig David
 Wouter Hamel
 Nils PetterMolvær
 Eric Benet
 Song Young Joo Quartet
 Be The Voice
 Urban Zakapa
 SondreLerche

2015
 Chick Corea
 Herbie Hancock
 Basement Jaxx
 Robert Glasper Experiment
 Jazzanova Live with Paul Randoph
 Caro Emerald 
 Owl City
 Jeff Bernat & Band
 Maximilian Hecker
 Sergio Mendes
 MIKA
 John Scofield Uberjam
 Babel Giberto
 The Bad Plus
 Wouter Hamel
 Arturo Sandoval
 Gregory Porter
 The Cardigans
 Tamia
 Jose James
 Nikki Yanofsky
 Epik High
 Uhuhboo Project
 Peppertones
 Kiha & The Faces
 Jazzyfact
 Koo Bonam Band
 Roy Kim

2016
 Paul Metheny
 Tha Nat King Cole Tribute
 Mark Ronson
 Corinne Bailey Rae
 Jason Derulo
 Esperanza Spalding
 Terence Blanchard
 Kurt Elling
 Flying Lotus
 Rufus Wainwright
 Wouter Hamel
 Rebirth Brass Band
 GoGo Penguin
 Redfoo
 Vintage Trouble
 Dirty Loops
 Beom June Jang
 Beenzino
 Peppertones
 Hyukoh

2017
Jamiroquai
Tower of Power
Honne
Cecile McLorin Salvant
Dianne Reeves
Lianne La Havas 
Arturo O'Farrill & The Afro Latin Jazz Ensemble
Avishai Cohen Quartet
Ji
Crush
Lucid Fall Quintet
Second Moon
Echae Kang
Squirrel Nut Zippers
Zion.T
10cm
Koh SangJi Tango X MUVAQ Orquesta
Yu Jun Sang's Jnjoy20 Band
Yun Seok Cheol Trio X Baek Ye-rin
Roy Kim

2018
Friday, May 19

Saturday, May 20

References 
http://www.seouljazz.co.kr/english

External links 

 

Music festivals in South Korea
Music festivals established in 2004
Jazz festivals in South Korea 
Annual events in South Korea
Autumn events in South Korea